Perth Airport  is an international, domestic and general aviation airport serving Perth, the capital city of Western Australia.

It is the fourth busiest airport in Australia measured by passenger movements and falls within the boundaries of the City of Belmont, City of Kalamunda and the City of Swan.

Since 1997, it has been operated by Perth Airport Pty Ltd under a 99-year lease from the Commonwealth Government.

Location

It is one of three civilian airports within the Perth metropolitan area, the others being Jandakot Airport and Rottnest Island Airport. Besides the civilian airports, there are also two military airports within the Perth metropolitan area. The larger of the two is RAAF Base Pearce,  to the north of Perth Airport, at Bullsbrook.

Growth and impact
The airport saw strong passenger growth from 2000 to 2012, primarily due to the state's prolonged mining boom and an increase in traffic from international low-cost carrier airlines. By the end of June 2012, Perth Airport experienced passenger growth of 11.7% internationally and 6.9% domestically, resulting in an overall increase of 10.3%. Passenger numbers trebled in the 10 years from 2002 to 2012 with more than 12.6 million people travelling through the airport in 2012. Since 2012, the winding down of the mining boom has seen the demand for both intra- and interstate services contract, with domestic passengers falling from a peak of 9.9 million (as of June 2013) to 9.5 million by the end of June 2016. The growth in passenger numbers since 2012 has been wholly due to expansion of international services from the city. The first mining boom in 1979 had 679,000 passengers use the airport. This number now travels through the airport every eighteen days.

As well as passenger movements however, complaints about the impact of the airport on the residents of Perth have grown. The City of Canning, one area that is affected, accepts that “aircraft noise is an important issue” and that “[it] does impact heavily on those suburbs under the flightpaths.” Another affected area, the City of Swan, “has experienced significant issues.” Indeed, planning policy adopted by the Government of Western Australia recognises that some aircraft noise is “not compatible with residential or educational” land use, two fundamental uses of land in any conurbation that is home to over two million residents—such as Greater Perth.

History

Early days
Prior to the opening of the Perth Airport, civilian air services for the city were provided from Maylands Aerodrome as well as on the city's foreshore at Langley Park. By the end of the 1930s, it became clear that the Maylands Aerodrome was limited in the size and speed of aircraft it was able to handle thus causing them to seek an alternative site for a future airport.

Site selection and preparation of the original plans was undertaken by Mr N M Fricker of the Department of Civil Aviation. In 1938, land was selected and purchased for the new aerodrome. The site selected in what was at the time Guildford, was an area of land granted by Governor James Stirling to local man John Scott, which later became the long disused Dunreath Golf Course.

A plaque located on a roadside wall of the old International terminal remains in permanent memory of Scott:

Military operations
Even before civil aviation operations could commence at the new site, the onset of World War II saw the facility being redesigned for military purposes as a temporary base for the Royal Australian Air Force and United States Navy, known as "RAAF Station Guildford", primarily to supplement RAAF Base Pearce. Royal Australian Air Force No. 85 Squadron was based there from February 1943.

Despite military use of the airfield, civil services operated by Qantas Empire Airways and Australian National Airways (ANA) commenced from the location in 1944. This was despite bitter protest from military authorities who felt civilian operations would undermine the defence and camouflage needs of the location.

The move was agreed to by the government, as the larger types of aircraft of the day being operated by the two airlines could simply not be handled at Maylands, notwithstanding the small grass airfield, lack of passenger facilities, and approaches being difficult due to surrounding industrial infrastructure. Using Douglas DC-3 aircraft, ANA flew the first commercial service from the aerodrome to Adelaide. On 17 June 1944, Qantas made its inaugural flight to Ceylon via Exmouth using a modified Consolidated B-24 Liberator, arriving in Perth on 3 June 1944 having been released to the airline by the British Government.

Early civilian operations

Full civilian operations at the Guildford Aerodrome commenced in 1944. Civil operations at Maylands continued albeit reduced until 30 June 1963, when the airport closed and its function as a secondary airport was taken over by Jandakot Airport the very next day.

Guildford Aerodrome was at best only a basic airfield. On a large open airfield with plenty of space, an unobtrusive control tower was hidden away amongst a collection of buildings inherited from the wartime operations at the site. The Department of Civil Aviation inherited a large number of operating vehicles from the former military occupants, including an assortment of vehicles including Blitz wagons, Dodge command cars and weapon carriers, large trucks and various makes of fire tenders, jeeps and ambulances. Boarding aircraft at Guildford was described as being a bit like boarding a bus given the lack of passenger facilities at the time.

In 1948, the Horrie Miller owned MacRobertson Miller Airlines (MMA) relocated from Maylands to Guildford. followed by newly formed government airline Trans Australia Airlines (TAA) on 2 December of that same year, operating Douglas C-54 Skymasters on its Perth – Melbourne – Sydney route. Due to the lack of road transportation across the Nullarbor Plain, it was at this time that Guildford became the scene of very busy cargo operations. Fresh fruit, vegetables and manufactured goods were being flown from east to west and back again.

The airport was granted international status in September 1952, and renamed from Guildford Aerodrome to Perth Airport in March 1953. Officiated by the Federal Minister for Civil Aviation, Hubert Anthony, the official ceremony for the renaming took place on the main apron in front of a converted Bellman hangar used by TAA as its passenger terminal. At the time, a new international terminal building was under construction but had not been completed in time for the ceremony. This new terminal was being constructed using steel and cladding recycled from American-built military quonset buildings being dismantled and shipped over from Manus Island.

It was also on this day that Qantas commenced its Wallaby service using Lockheed Constellations from Sydney to South Africa via Perth, the Cocos Islands and Mauritius.

The jet age

Towards the mid-1950s, airline travel was still being used by only a small percentage of the population. At that time, only 8% of the population had ever flown, but as the marketplace evolved, so did the types of people and their reasons for flying.

It was at this time the airport began to experience the full effects of the jet age. Although both Air India and Qantas commenced operating Boeing 707s in the mid to late 1950s from Perth to Singapore and the sub continent the aircraft of the day grew faster and more demanding due to their sophistication, facilities at the airport continued to improve to accommodate them. By the mid-1960s the airport commenced seeing its first domestic pure jet engine aircraft, commencing with a Boeing 727 in 1964, and the Douglas DC-9 in 1967, both types operated by TAA and Ansett ANA. It was at this time that the airport was one of the few major airports in the country which operated without curfews, and due to the increased number and frequency of flights operating from the airport it gave birth to what was then referred to as the midnight horror or red-eye special, known in more recent history as the red-eye flight.

Demise of the hangar terminals
In 1960, the then international terminal previously constructed from steel and cladding from Manus Island was dismantled and then re-erected in the suburb of Cannington. Known as The Alco Building, it was re-designed for use as a commercial facility.

The removal of the steel structure made way for the construction of an entirely new combined domestic and international passenger terminal, constructed on the northern side of the airfield. It was in 1962 that airlines were able to move from their hangars into a new combined passenger terminal, designed by the Commonwealth Department of Works and opened just in time to handle 1962 British Empire and Commonwealth Games traffic increases. The new combined terminal was opened that same year by then Minister for Civil Aviation, Senator Shane Paltridge; it was built in an area positioned between the present Terminals 3 and 4 and is currently used as the crew base for both Qantas and Skywest, and offices for airlines and support firms.

International terminal development
From 1962 onwards, both the domestic and international passenger operations at the airport were provided by a single terminal. However, by the arrival of the Boeing 747 on 3 September 1971, the existing terminal had reached its capacity, and modelling of future passenger numbers showed it would be unable to handle any further increases in passenger demand.

In November 1980, the Federal Transport Minister, Ralph Hunt, announced that a new international terminal would be built in Perth at a cost of $26 million (1980). Design of the new International Terminal commenced in 1982, with one of the key principles of the design being the allowance for easy future expansion as the needs of the airport dictated. The project called for the construction of a new terminal, apron, airside roads, access roads, car parks and other passenger facilities.

Construction of the new International Terminal and control tower commenced in March 1984 on the south-eastern side of the airfield. In 1984, the road leading to the new terminal, Horrie Miller Drive was named in honour of local aviation pioneer Horrie Miller. The terminal was officially opened on 25 October 1986 by Prime Minister Bob Hawke, with the new terminal receiving passengers just days after. The newly built control tower was the tallest in Australia at its time of construction, and remains the tallest in Australia.

Upon completion, the terminal was able to process up to five Boeing 747 aircraft per hour and accommodated a peak passenger volume of 6,000 passengers per hour. Twenty years later, in the 12 months to June 2006 the terminal processed over 2.027 million passengers, surpassing a 1996 projection of 1.016 million passengers in that period.

1988 onwards

In the late 1980s the Federal Government, as a prelude to eventual privatisation, formed the Federal Airports Corporation (FAC). In 1988, the FAC took over as manager of Perth Airport (and many other Australian airports).

At this time also, airline operators Qantas and Ansett set about on ambitious capital works programs to construct new domestic terminals for their respective airlines on the northern side of the terminal, where they still stand to this day. In 2001, after the financial collapse of Ansett, the Ansett terminal became a multi-user terminal, catering for flights from former Ansett-subsidiary Skywest, as well as Virgin Australia and now charter airlines including Alliance Airlines and previously Air Australia.

In July 1997 Perth Airport Pty Ltd took up a 99-year lease as part of the Federal Government's push to privatise airports. As at February 2021, Utilities Trust of Australia (38%) and Future Fund (30%) were the major shareholders.

From 2003 to 2004, the International terminal underwent major internal refurbishments to provide an increased array of passenger services, including increased space for duty-free stores and food and beverage concession stands. Further upgrades valued at $25 million (2006) were made to the terminal across 2005 and 2006 which added an additional  of floor space, additional check-in counters, and an improved baggage handling and screening system.

The airport commemorated its 60th anniversary in 2004, with an event that opened the new Taxiway Sierra, a new taxiway supporting larger aircraft such as the Boeing 747, Airbus A340 and Airbus A380.

On 14 October 2008, the Airbus A380 made its first visit to the airport as a part of Qantas' A380 promotional tour around Australia. The second A380 to visit the airport was an Emirates aircraft which made an emergency landing on 15 August 2009, after a passenger on a Dubai to Sydney flight suffered a stroke.

In 2012, the Australian Competition & Consumer Commission (ACCC) released a report rating the Perth Airport as the worst in Australia, as judged by airlines. The same report rated it below satisfactory for the second year in a row. However, due to recent expansions and projects, the airport was awarded Capital City airport of the year by the Australian Airports Association at their national conference in 2016. In 2018, Perth Airport was named the best airport in Australia for overall service quality by the ACCC after the completion of a $1 billion redevelopment project over the span of 5 years.

Terminal 2 was officially opened on 28 February 2013, with the first flights operating out of the terminal on 2 March 2013. The single story terminal was designed to provide;
 At-grade access to terminal building,
 16 common use check-in counters, including space for self-service and bag drop technologies,
 Centralised passenger security screening zone,
 Three baggage reclaim belts,
 Dedicated pick-up and drop-off lanes at the front of the terminal,
 14 aircraft bays, accessible from enclosed walkways and serviced by 8 boarding counters, and
 36 additional aircraft parking bays.

In April 2015 works commenced on a $42 million upgrade of the forecourt and the passenger pick-up/drop-off areas in front of Terminal 1 to improve access. The upgrade was completed in November 2016.

In May 2015, Emirates commenced the first Airbus A380 service to Perth from Dubai following the completion of a dual level boarding gate, an expanded check-in hall, a refurbished departure area and other expansions to Terminal 1 including a new Emirates business class lounge. In August 2017, Emirates replaced its last remaining Emirates Boeing 777-300ER service with an Airbus A380, taking the total Emirates daily services to two.
However, this service was replaced by a Boeing 777 in 2020, during the COVID-19 pandemic. On 1 November 2022, the first regular A380 service resumed.

On 22 November 2015 the domestic pier of Terminal 1 was opened; the pier became the exclusive home to Virgin Australia. Virgin Australia's partner, Etihad Airways began daily direct services from its hub in Abu Dhabi on 16 July 2014; the pier ensures quick and seamless transfers between the two airlines. The pier will also be connected to Terminal 2 via an elevated walkway allowing seamless transfer to Virgin's regional services without having to be re-screened.

On 15 May 2016, the world's largest commercial jet airliner, the Antonov An-225 Mriya landed at Perth Airport, making its first visit to Perth and Australia.

On 3 November 2016, construction of a commuter rail link to the airport was started, with Airport Central station on the Airport line linking the future consolidated terminal precinct with the greater Transperth railway network. The Airport line, which opened on 9 October 2022 and is underground below Perth airport, converges with the Midland line at Bayswater station. Also constructed was a pedestrian "skybridge" linking the station to Terminal 1.

On 11 December 2016, Qantas announced that it would commence non-stop flights from Perth to London Heathrow with one of its newly acquired Boeing 787 Dreamliners. To achieve this the Qantas domestic terminal at T3/T4 was upgraded during 2017 to cater for international flights. Once completed the existing Qantas flights to Singapore and Auckland also migrated to the same terminal. Services started in March 2018.

Facilities and services

Perth Airport has five terminals: four main terminals and one minor terminal.

 On the eastern side of the airport (and the location of the future consolidated terminal precinct) is,
 Terminal 1 (T1), originally the International terminal, caters for flights originating or departing outside Australia, with five jetways and a total of eight gates including a Multi Access Ramp System which allows dual boarding of aircraft including the Boeing 777 and Airbus A380. There are four airline lounges: the Emirates lounge; Singapore Airlines Silver Kris lounge; the Air New Zealand Lounge and Qantas Captains Club. The Emirates lounge has a second level and offer direct boarding on their flagship Airbus A380 aircraft. In November 2015, a new domestic pier opened at the west end of T1 to service Virgin Australia domestic flights.
 Terminal 2 (T2) is located to the immediate south west of T1. Virgin Australia Regional and Alliance commenced operations from T2 in 2013 whilst Rex Airlines commenced operations from T2 in 2016.
 On the western side of the airport are the remaining terminals,
 Terminal 3 (T3) has five jetways and a total of nine gates. Since 23 November 2015, it is currently used by Jetstar, although some Qantas services also operate from the terminal. It was the previous location for Virgin Australia and had a recently expanded member lounge, which utilised the space from the former Ansett Golden Wing Club / Alliance Airlines Lounge. The Qantas Group has exclusive use of both T3 and T4 since the movement of Virgin Australia to T1. Since March 2018, Qantas international departures have taken place at T3, having moved from T1.
 Terminal 4 (T4), the Qantas terminal, is operated by Qantas Group and is dedicated to the domestic operations of Qantas, QantasLink and fellow budget subsidiary Jetstar. The terminal has four jetways and a total of nine gates. It has two member lounge: The Qantas Club, which was expanded in March 2013 to cater for an additional 140 passengers; and the Qantas Domestic Business Lounge, which opened in 2014. In 2018 Qantas opened a new international area in T4 as it had started flights from Perth to London. The Perth Airport Master Plan outlines these terminals will ultimately be demolished and replaced by new domestic facilities east of T1.
 There is also a northern general aviation terminal simply called General Aviation that is used primarily by some charter aircraft and for mining companies with fly-in fly-out services, with Jandakot airport also serving that function.

Runways
Flights are serviced by two runways – the main 03/21 runway,  and 06/24, .

After a 10-month project, a reconstructed cross runway was opened on 21 October 2005. The upgrades involved significant strengthening works and enlargement of turning nodes to accommodate regular operations by wide bodied aircraft, including the Airbus A380.

Meteorological services
Meteorological services for Perth Airport commenced in May 1944, provided by the Guildford Meteorological Office situated at Ivy Street, Redcliffe.

In March 1988, surface observations were moved to the recently vacated old airport tower on the northern side of the airfield (near what is now Terminal 3). The Ivy Street location was retained for a time for radar services and the launching and tracking of weather balloons. In October 1997, all operations from the Ivy Street Office and Old Control Tower were transferred to a newly constructed office on the Northern Perimeter Road in Belmont, in the north-eastern corner of the airfield.

Landing patterns and approach
Perth Airport resides within the Melbourne FIR, which is managed by Melbourne Centre and operated by Airservices Australia.

Observation areas

There are two dedicated spotting areas at Perth Airport. Terminal T1 has an Observation Deck on level 3 to view departing and arriving aircraft. It has vending machines, toilets and flight information displays.

The second spotting area is to the west side opposing the threshold of Runway 03 located along Dunreath Drive. The public viewing area has a shelter in the shape of the body section of a Boeing 747, and displays of information about the history of aviation.

Other services
The Australian Transport Safety Bureau has its Perth regional office on Level 2 of the Hkew Alpha Building on the property of Perth Domestic Airport.

Since May 2014, terminals T1 International, T2 Regional and T3 Domestic have a free Wi-Fi connection currently powered by iiNet. It is accessible throughout the entirety of the departure and arrival areas. Currently, T4 Qantas Domestic also has a free Wi-Fi service provided by Qantas.

The Royal Automobile Club of Western Australia (RAC) had a purpose-built driver training facility at Perth Airport, the only one of its kind in the state. It was located towards the east of the current T1 International Terminal on Grogan Road.

Airlines and destinations

Perth Airport is served by 26 scheduled airlines flying to over 50 destinations in Australia, Oceania, Asia, Africa and Europe. A total of 1258 scheduled domestic and regional flights arrive and depart from Perth Airport each week. On the international front, a total of 213 scheduled international flights arrive and depart from Perth Airport each week. The following carriers operate to the following destinations:

Passenger

Cargo

Operations and statistics

Total
Total passengers using the airport has increased on average by 5.8% annually since 1998–99, with 70% of passenger traffic at the airport attributed to domestic travel.

Domestic

International

Ground transport

Road
Road access from the city centre to terminals T1 and T2 is via Tonkin Highway and Airport Drive, and to terminals T3 and T4 via Tonkin Highway and Dunreath Drive. All terminals are serviced by a number of private charter bus operators that can normally be accessed through most major hotels in the city centre.

Transperth operates route 292, a circular route connecting terminals T3 and T4 to Redcliffe station.
Transperth operates route 37, a route connecting terminals T1 and T2 to Oats Street station, on the Armadale line.

A large number of taxi companies have set up operations in the past, and provide transport facilities from the airport to other parts of the city.

Rail

Commencing operation on 9 October 2022, the Airport line is the newest in Perth's urban passenger rail system, which is part of the Transperth network.

Passengers for Terminals 3 and 4 can catch bus route 292, a circular service from Terminals 3 and 4 to Redcliffe Station.

Accidents and incidents

During construction
 On 13 April 1987, a Hiller 12E helicopter was being used for the installation of a rotating beacon atop the control tower, then under construction. The beacon was attached to the helicopter for lifting by a chain sling. After the beacon had been lifted into place, workers disconnected the chain sling from it. As the helicopter was departing, The hook on the sling became snagged on the tower guard rail ... causing it to pitch nose down and roll to the right. With the cable being tensioned by the pull of the helicopter the hook freed itself [and sprang] while crashing the strike side of the tower towards the helicopter. The cable flew up around the tail boom and became entangled in one of the main rotor blades. The other main rotor blade severed the tail boom which fell free of the helicopter striking the side of the tower on its way to the ground. The major section of the helicopter then fell to the ground at the base of the tower, caught fire and was burnt out.The accident resulted in the death of the helicopter pilot. The subsequent investigation conducted by the Australian Transport Safety Board, found that the pilot's licence was not endorsed for sling loading operations and he was not sufficiently current on the aircraft type to undertake such a job.

Accidents en route

 On 2 July 1949 a Douglas DC-3, named Fitzroy, departed from Perth Airport for Carnarvon. Moments after takeoff it crashed about a mile north of the airport, killing all 18 people on board.

 On 26 June 1950 a Douglas DC-4 Skymaster, named Amana, departed from Perth Airport for Adelaide. It crashed 22 minutes later, near York, Western Australia, killing 28 of the 29 occupants. The sole survivor died in a Perth hospital six days later. This accident and the TAA Fokker Friendship disaster remain Australia's worst civil aviation accidents.

Emergency alternative airports
There are three emergency alternative airports for Perth, used usually in the case of fog or bad weather affecting Perth. In 2013, the state government flagged the need for a new emergency alternative airport, with Exmouth's Learmonth Airport and Adelaide Airport being inconvenient due to their significant distance from Perth. In 2017, plans for Cunderdin Airport to become a diversion airport for Perth were put in place. In 2018, it was proposed that Kalgoorlie-Boulder Airport would be a better alternative than Cunderdin. In 2019, Busselton Margaret River Airport had its bid to become a designated alternate international airport approved.

Future development

Consolidation of terminals
The Perth Airport Master Plan 2014 aims for the domestic and international terminals to be consolidated into a single terminal on the south-eastern side of the airfield by 2024. In 2008, Westralia Airports announced their intention to complete a A$1 billion upgrade project which addresses key elements of the Master Plan while complete the upgrade project key elements of the 2014 Master Plan.

Third runway
The construction of a new runway (03R/21L) is planned. Although Perth Airport plans for the runway to open by 2027, if demand is high enough in the coming years, the airport will set a 2024 opening instead, the same year the terminals are expected to be consolidated.

Notes

References

Further reading

External links

 Airservices Aerodromes & Procedure Charts

 
Transport in Perth, Western Australia
Airports in Western Australia
World War II airfields in Australia
Buildings and structures in Perth, Western Australia
Airports established in 1938
1938 establishments in Australia
International airports in Australia